Harg is an unincorporated community in Boone County, in the U.S. state of Missouri.

History
A post office called Harg was established in 1892, and remained in operation until 1907. The community was named after John H. McHarg, a local merchant.

References

Unincorporated communities in Boone County, Missouri
Unincorporated communities in Missouri